Maplin may refer to:

 Maplin (retailer), an electrical retailer in the UK and Ireland
 Maplin Sands, a series of mudflats on the northern bank of the Thames estuary
 Maplins, a fictional holiday camp from the sitcom Hi-de-Hi!